Connect the Dots is the second studio album by American indie pop band MisterWives, released on May 19, 2017 through Republic Records. The album serves as a follow-up to the band's debut studio album, Our Own House (2015). It was produced by Butch Walker and Etienne Bowler.

Background

After extensive touring in support of their debut studio album, Our Own House (2015), MisterWives began writing and recording their second studio album with producers Butch Walker and Etienne Bowler. The band confirmed that their second album was "finally complete" on December 17, 2016. The band released the single "Machine" on February 17, 2017. The following week, on February 24, the band officially announced Connect the Dots, revealing its track listing, album art cover, and release date.

Promotion

Connect the Dots was preceded by its lead single "Machine", which was released for digital download and streaming on February 17, 2017. On March 30, the band released another single, titled "Oh Love". A third single, "Drummer Boy", was released on April 20.

MisterWives toured as support on Panic! at the Disco's Death of a Bachelor tour in North America from February 14 to April 15, 2017.

Track listing

Personnel
Adapted credits from the liner notes of Connect the Dots.
MisterWives
 Mandy Lee – lead vocals, composer
 William Hehir – bass guitar, gang vocals
 Marc Campbell – lead guitar, gang vocals
 Jesse Blum – keyboards, synthesizer, piano, gang vocals

Additional personnel
 Butch Walker – producer, programming, recording engineer, synthesizer, keyboards, gang vocals
 Etienne Bowler – producer, drums, percussion, programming, synthesizer, gang vocals
 Todd Stopera – recording engineer
 Neal Avron – mixing engineer

Artwork
 Matt Burnette-Lemon – package production
 Mary Ellen Matthews – photography
 Joe Spix – art direction and design
 Viktoriya Tsoy – design

Charts

References

2017 albums
MisterWives albums
Republic Records albums
Photo Finish Records albums
Albums produced by Butch Walker